Payane Jonoob (South Terminal) Metro Station, formerly called Terminal-e Jonoob is a station in Tehran Metro Line 1. It is located in Tehran southern Bus Terminal. It is between Khazane Metro Station and Shush Metro Station.

References 

Tehran Metro stations